Kunikane-ike Dam  is an earthfill dam located in Hiroshima Prefecture in Japan. The dam is used for irrigation. The catchment area of the dam is 13.6 km2. The dam impounds about 25  ha of land when full and can store 1060 thousand cubic meters of water. The construction of the dam was started on 1946 and completed in 1953.

References

Dams in Hiroshima Prefecture